Space Jockey is a horizontally scrolling shooter designed by Garry Kitchen for the Atari VCS (renamed to the Atari 2600 later in the year). It was published under the Vidtec brand of U.S. Games in 1982 as the initial release from the company.  The game shipped on a 2K cartridge at a time when most VCS games were 4K. Atari, Inc. stopped internal development of 2K games for the console in 1980. 

Space Jockey was the first video game written by Kitchen. He went on to program the 2600 port of Donkey Kong for Coleco.

Gameplay
The player controls an "attack saucer" that flies to the right over scrolling, undulating terrain. The saucer only moves vertically and stops just before it hits the ground. The goal is to shoot ground-based tanks and flying enemies: jet planes, propeller planes, helicopters, and hot air balloons. Trees and houses appear on the ground as obstacles which can also be destroyed.

Reception
Space Jockey was one of three runners-up for the "Best Science Fiction/Fantasy Videogame" category in the 1983 Arcade Awards.

According to a 2014 interview with Kitchen, Space Jockey sold over a million copies, but he believes most of those were at a discount. A February 1983 Billboard article on retailers lowering game prices mentioned, "US Games recently sold off one of its older hits, the 2K Space Jockey, at rock bottom prices through its distributors."

Dan Gutman wrote in Electronic Fun with Computers & Games, "The graphics here don't knock you out. The sound is nothing to phone home about. Space Jockey is a pure test of your reaction time and doesn't pretend to be anything more."

References

External links
TV commercial
Gameplay video

1982 video games
Atari 2600 games
Atari 2600-only games
Horizontally scrolling shooters
Single-player video games
U.S. Games games
Video games designed by Garry Kitchen
Video games developed in the United States